Edern Le Ruyet (born 1987) is a French slalom canoeist who has competed at the international level since 2004. He competes in C1 and C2. His partner in the C2 boat is Pierre-Antoine Tillard.

He won a bronze medal in the C1 team event at the 2017 ICF Canoe Slalom World Championships in Pau.

World Cup individual podiums

1 Oceania Canoe Slalom Open counting for World Cup points

References

French male canoeists
Living people
1987 births
Medalists at the ICF Canoe Slalom World Championships
21st-century French people